The 1139 Ganja earthquake was one of the worst seismic events in history. It affected the Seljuk Empire and Kingdom of Georgia; modern-day Azerbaijan and Georgia. The earthquake had an estimated magnitude of 7.7 , 7.5  and 7.0–7.3 . A controversial death toll of 230,000–300,000 came as a consequence of this event.

Tectonic setting

Azerbaijan and Georgia is located in an area of high seismic activity as both countries are situated in the collision zone between the Eurasian and Arabian Plates. The collision zone consists of an accreted island arc that collided after the closure of the Tethys Ocean, continental blocks, and sediments from the Mesozoic and Tertiary eras. The area is separated into three geographical regions; Lesser Caucasus, Kura Basin and Greater Caucasus. Seismic activity in the Lesser Caucasus is typically associated with strike-slip faults with vertical dip angles. In the Greater Caucasus, seismic activity correspond to thrust faulting. Extending  beneath the Greater Caucasus is the remnant of a subducted tectonic plate after the ocean closed. Earthquakes are caused by crustal compression and shear as the two tectonic plates interact.

Earthquake
A maximum intensity of IX (Violent) to XI (Extreme) on the Mercalli intensity scale was assigned. It was also perceived as far as Aleppo where the felt intensity was II (Weak).

This region of the Lesser Caucasus is dominated with oblique and strike-slip tectonics. The source fault of the earthquake was the Pambak-Sevan-Syunik Fault; a 490-kilometer-long WNW–ESE striking strike-slip fault. For the majority of its length, the fault demonstrated right-lateral displacement, but at the westernmost segment, slip is left-lateral. The earthquake ruptured the Mrav segment of the fault at the eastern end. Unlike the rest of the Pambak-Sevan-Syunik Fault, this segment is characterized by a series of north-dipping thrust faults. Paleoseismology in the region indicate large earthquakes of up to  7.5 have occurred on the fault. The Pambak-Sevan-Syunik Fault was also responsible for the 1931 Zangezur earthquake.

Damage

Mkhitar Gosh, an Armenian scholar and writer, quoted Job 9:6 and Psalm 103:32 from the Holy Bible to describe the earthquake. He described tremendous damage in the P'ar'isos and Xach'e'n districts of Syunik. The city of Ganzak also suffered devastation, leaving many of the townspeople buried under ruins. Many structures including monasteries and churches castles and villages in the mountainous region were totally destroyed. The number of people who died in the mountains is not known, described as "incalculable". Strong shaking triggered massive landslides off the sides of mountains and canyons in the Caucasus Mountains region. Parts of Kapaz Mount collapsed, and the resulting landslide blocking the Kürəkçay River, forming Lake Göygöl. Another six lakes formed, including Maral-gol and Lake Ağgöl.

The estimated death toll from this earthquake is somewhere between 230,000 and 300,000 making it one of the deadliest earthquakes in history. Among the dead were two sons of then ruler of the Seljuk Empire, Qara Sonqor. The death toll figure remains controversial with some authors stating it is an exaggeration considering the population of the area at the time of the disaster, or that this was a conflation with the 1138 Aleppo and 1137 Jazira earthquakes.

Aftermath
King Demetrius I of Georgia took advantage of the earthquake and looted the city. Troops stole many artifacts and prized items from the city, including the Ancient Gates of Ganja which was utilized as a trophy.  The city was reconstructed by Qara Sonqor, where it began to flourish.

See also
List of earthquakes
List of historical earthquakes
List of earthquakes in Azerbaijan
List of earthquakes in Georgia (country)

References

Earthquakes in Azerbaijan
Earthquakes in Georgia (country)
12th-century earthquakes
1139
1130s in Asia
History of Ganja, Azerbaijan
History of Georgia (country)
Landslide-dammed lakes
Medieval Azerbaijan
Geology of Azerbaijan
12th century in Georgia (country)
Medieval Georgia (country)
Earthquakes in Armenia
Medieval Armenia
12th century in the Seljuk Empire